The WABA Champions Cup 2007 was the 10th staging of the WABA Champions Cup, the basketball club tournament of West Asia Basketball Association. The tournament was held in Aleppo, Syria between April 1 and April 9. The top four teams from different countries qualify for the FIBA Asia Champions Cup 2007.

Preliminary round

Group A

Group B

Final round

Quarterfinals

Semifinals 5th–8th

Semifinals

7th place

5th place

3rd place

Final

Final standing

External links
Goalzz.com

2007
International basketball competitions hosted by Syria
2006–07 in Asian basketball
2006–07 in Jordanian basketball
2006–07 in Iranian basketball
2006–07 in Lebanese basketball
2007 in Syrian sport
2007 in Iraqi sport
Bask
Sport in Aleppo